Satterthwaite is a civil parish in the South Lakeland District of Cumbria, England.  It contains eight listed buildings that are recorded in the National Heritage List for England.  Of these, one is listed at Grade II*, the middle of the three grades, and the others are at Grade II, the lowest grade.  The parish is in the Lake District National Park.  It contains the village of Satterthwaite, and is otherwise entirely rural.  The listed buildings consist of houses and associated structures, and two former mills.


Key

Buildings

Notes

References

Lists of listed buildings in Cumbria